Axiocerses karinae is a butterfly in the family Lycaenidae. It is found in Malawi.

Adults have been recorded in May, December, January and February.

The larvae feed on Ximenia caffra. They are associated with ants of the genus Crematogaster.

References

Butterflies described in 1996
Axiocerses
Endemic fauna of Malawi
Butterflies of Africa